Futuh al-Haramayn (a Handbook for Pilgrims to Mecca and Medina) is considered the first Islamic guidebook for pilgrimage. It was written by Muhi al-Din Lari and completed in India in 1505–6. The book was dedicated to Muzaffar ibn Mahmudshah, the ruler of Gujarat. No early illustrated Indian copies are known, but later in the 16th century it was widely copied in Ottoman Turkey. The book describes the full rituals of the Hajj in order, and describes the religious sites one can visit.

Manuscripts 
More than twenty manuscripts of the Futuh are known to exist.

References 

Islamic studies books
Hajj accounts
Islamic literature
Persian-language literature